Frank Russek (1875/1876 - December 10, 1948) was an American businessman, and the co-founder of the Russeks department store chain.

Biography
Russek was a Polish Jewish immigrant who arrived in New York City in the late 1800s as a teenager. Russek started as a furrier in New York City in the early 1900s and later joined by two of his brothers, expanded into luxury clothing and accessories. In 1924, they opened a department store on Fifth Avenue and Thirty-sixth Street and named it Russeks Fifth Avenue, Inc. By 1936, they employed 500-600 people.

Personal life
He married Rose Anhalt in Manhattan on 18 June 1899, and they had two children, Gertrude Russek (1901-1994), and Harold Russek (1903-?). Gertrude Russek married David Nemerov, and they were the parents of Diane Arbus and Howard Nemerov.

Russek died on December 10, 1948. He was a member of Temple Emanu-El in Manhattan where his funeral services were held.

References

1870s births
1948 deaths
American company founders
American businesspeople in retailing
American Jews
Russek family